Nancy Abigail Baker Heche (née Prickett, born March 10, 1937) is an American activist. She is the mother of actress Anne Heche. In 2006, she published a memoir, The Truth Comes Out.

Biography
Prickett is the daughter of Marietta Susan (Tukey) and Richard Carleton Prickett. As a child, she attended a Methodist church and was raised in Indiana. 

She met her future husband, Donald Joe Heche, in high school. Her husband co-founded a schismatic fundamentalist Baptist church. They lived with their children on an isolated compound in the Amish country near Burton, Ohio from the early 1960s until 1971. Heche stated that "I didn’t read a newspaper or watch television or listen to the radio for nearly 10 years. Don’t ask me about Top 40 songs or news events in the late 1960s or early 1970s. I never heard them."

In 1983, Donald Heche died of AIDS. Upon learning of the diagnosis, Heche became aware that her husband had been a closeted gay man. Three months following the death of her husband, Heche's 18-year-old son Nathan was killed in a car crash.

Since 1997, Nancy Heche has been a Christian pastoral counselor. As of 2022, four of her five children are deceased.

Relationship with Anne Heche 

In 1997, Heche's daughter, Anne, publicly announced her relationship with comedian Ellen DeGeneres. Heche said, "She became sort of the poster child for coming out and bringing the whole homosexual issue into the public eye and even glamorizing and humorizing it, laughing about it, making it just another kind of love relationship". Heche said her daughter's sexuality was "like a betrayal of an unspoken vow: We will never have anything to do with homosexuals." After reading the Old Testament book of Isaiah, Heche became convinced that sexual orientation change was possible for her daughter, and likened what she believed would be their eventual reconciliation to the parable of the Prodigal Son.

Heche became estranged from Anne after the latter confronted her about her father's alleged sexual abuse. In her 2001 memoir Call Me Crazy, Anne wrote that when she contracted genital herpes as an infant, her mother insisted that it was a diaper rash and refused to take her to the doctor. Heche vehemently denied her daughter's allegations, responding on an internet forum, "I am trying to find a place for myself in this writing, a place where I as Anne's mother do not feel violated or scandalized. I find no place among the lies and blasphemies in the pages of this book." Heche's daughter Abigail added, "I would like to point out that Anne, in the past, has expressed doubts herself about the accuracy of such memories. Based on my experience and her own expressed doubts, I believe that her memories regarding our father are untrue. And I can state emphatically, regardless of Anne's beliefs, that the assertion that our mother knew about such behavior is absolutely false."

Anti-LGBT activism 
Since 2005, Nancy Heche has been an activist on behalf of Love Won Out, a group with ties to Focus on the Family, about "overcoming homosexuality". Heche believes that homosexuality is a sin and that through faith in Jesus Christ people can change their sexual orientation, noting that she is not attempting to "convert" gays. She speaks in many areas of the country, often at churches and other organized events, about "leaving homosexuality". Speaking about Heche's activism, Melissa Fryrear, a self-described "former lesbian" and Focus on the Family's director of gender issues for their government and public policy division, said, "It's wonderful because she obviously offers two unique perspectives, one that she is the parent of someone involved in the homosexual lifestyle and as a spouse whose husband led a secret life."

Heche has been a speaker for Parents and Friends of Ex-Gays and Gays (PFOX). On September 8, 2006, Heche was the "Back of the Book guest" on the Fox News show The O'Reilly Factor.
She appeared twice on the Christian Broadcasting Network's Engaging your World in December 2006.

Heche adheres to the Bible's "mandate that Christians must love, gays and lesbians included". She has said, "We are supposed to be known by our love. So to categorize it or think it's going to be different for someone who is living homosexually is a misconception. We just show love." Heche has been criticized by other Christian activists, both those who believe that a person's sexuality is determined by God and those who believe that homosexuality is a sin.

In 2009, Anne Heche told the New York Times: "My mother's had a very tragic life. Three of her five children are dead, and her husband is dead. That she is attempting to change gay people into straight people is, in my opinion, a way to keep the pain of the truth out".

Published works

See also
 Christianity and homosexuality

References

Bibliography

External links
 Obituary of Donald Joe Heche

1937 births
Living people
20th-century American women
21st-century American women
American Christians
Christian fundamentalists
Ex-gay movement
People from Albion, Indiana
Writers from Illinois